Ak-Tash is a village in Osh Region of Kyrgyzstan. It is part of the Kara-Suu District. Its population was 5,148 in 2021. It is on the border with Uzbekistan, 7 km southwest of Kara-Suu.

Population

References 

Populated places in Osh Region